Martín Nicolás Zilic Hrepic (born 22 April 1947) is a Chilean physician and former politician. While a student in the University of Concepción he participated in the November 18, 1971, meeting with Fidel Castro. During his time as Minister of Education he had to face the 2006 student protests in Chile.

References

External links
 Interview to him at the University of Concepción

1947 births
Living people
Chilean people
University of Concepción alumni
Université catholique de Louvain alumni
Christian Democratic Party (Chile) politicians
Chilean people of Croatian descent